Noordeen Mashoor (Nurdeen Mashur) was a Sri Lankan politician and Member of Parliament.

Mashoor represented the Vanni multi-member electoral district in the Sri Lankan Parliament between October 2000 and April 2004, firstly for the National Unity Alliance then the United National Front (UNF).

Mashoor returned to Parliament in April 2010, this time representing Vanni for the UNF.

Mashoor died of a heart attack at a private hospital in Colombo on 2 December 2010.

References
 

1962 births
2010 deaths
Members of the 11th Parliament of Sri Lanka
Members of the 12th Parliament of Sri Lanka
Members of the 14th Parliament of Sri Lanka
Sri Lanka Muslim Congress politicians